Thomas Livingstone (2 September 1889 – 1956) was a New Zealand cricketer who played for Otago.

Livingstone made three first-class appearances for the team, during the 1917–18 season. He scored 14 runs during his first-class career, all of which came in a single innings, against Southland.

Livingstone was a lower-order batsman.

See also
 List of Otago representative cricketers

External links
Thomas Livingstone at Cricket Archive

1889 births
1956 deaths
New Zealand cricketers
Otago cricketers